Kahn-e Pain (also Romanized as Kahn-e Pā’īn and Kohan-e Pā’īn; also known as Kahan, Kahan Barānī, Kahn, Kahnak, Kahn Balūchānī, Khān, Kohan Balūchānī, Kohan Balūchī, Kohan Barātī, and Ūshāb) is a village in Talang Rural District, Talang District, Qasr-e Qand County, Sistan and Baluchestan Province, Iran. At the 2006 census, its population was 215, in 50 families.

References 

Populated places in Qasr-e Qand County